Tur Gir (also Romanized as Ţūr Gīr and Tūr Gīr; also known as Qal‘eh Tūr Gīr) is a village in Sang Sefid Rural District, Qareh Chay District, Khondab County, Markazi Province, Iran. At the 2006 census, its population was 918, in 232 families.

References 

Populated places in Khondab County